"Selfish Love" is a song recorded by DJ Snake and Selena Gomez. It was released through Interscope Records on March 4, 2021, as the third and final single from Gomez's fourth EP, Revelación. "Selfish Love" marks the second collaboration between DJ Snake and Gomez, the first being "Taki Taki" in 2018.

Background and release 
On February 24, 2021, DJ Snake posted a video to his social media accounts displaying messages with Selena Gomez about them receiving the RIAA 4× Platinum certification plaque for "Taki Taki", their previous collab with Cardi B and Ozuna. He then sends Gomez a message reading; "I think it's time we gave them another one", followed by an audio clip. They announced the release date and title of the single the following day, February 25.

Music video
The song was released on March 4, 2021, along with its music video. A music video was released alongside the song. The video is set inside an oriental hair salon, accompanied by psychedelic transitions and costumes.

Accolades

Track listing
 Digital download
 "Selfish Love" – 2:48

 Digital download – Tiësto remix

 "Selfish Love" (Tiësto remix) – 2:33

 Digital download - Jack Chirak remix

 "Selfish Love" (Jack Chirak remix) - 2:42

 Selfish Love EP
 "Selfish Love" (Acoustic Mix) - 2:49
 "Selfish Love" (Jack Chirak remix) - 2:42
 "Selfish Love" (Tiësto remix) – 2:33
 "Selfish Love" – 2:48

Composition 

"Selfish Love" is a tropical house and dance song with dubstep influences, Latin, Middle Eastern and "chill" saxophone rhythms. With lyrics in both Spanish and English, the song tells the story of a girl admitting feelings of jealousy. The song was written by DJ Snake and Gomez alongside Kat Dahlia, Kris Floyd, K Sotomayor and Marty Maro, and was produced by DJ Snake and Maro.

Credits and personnel
Credits adapted from Tidal.

 DJ Snake – songwriting, production, mixing
 Selena Gomez – vocals, songwriting
 Maro – songwriting, production
 K Sotomayor – songwriting
 Kat Dahlia – songwriting, backing vocals
 Kris Floyd – songwriting
 Bart Schoudel – engineering, vocal engineering
 Nicholas Mercier – engineering, mastering, mixing

Charts

Weekly charts

Year-end charts

Certifications

Release history

Notes

References

External links
 
 

2021 singles
2021 songs
DJ Snake songs
Macaronic songs
Spanglish songs
Selena Gomez songs
Songs written by DJ Snake
Songs written by Selena Gomez
Interscope Records singles
Songs about jealousy